Homaemus parvulus is a species of shield-backed bug in the family Scutelleridae.  It is found in Central America and North America.

References

Further reading

 
 
 

Scutelleridae
Insects described in 1839